The Ligue 1 (for sponsorship reasons Ligue 1 Orange) is the premier basketball competition for clubs in Mali. The league consist out of ten teams. The current defending champions are Stade Malien, who won the 2022 title.

The champions of the league are eligible to play in the qualifying rounds of the Basketball Africa League (BAL).

Current teams 
The following were the eight teams for the 2019 season:
AS Police
USFAS Bamako
Attar Club
AS Real Bamako
Stade Malien
AS Sigui
Djoliba AC
AS Mandé
CBD
KBC

Champions

Malian Cup

Super Cup

In the Basketball Africa League
In the 2021 season, AS Police made its debut in the Basketball Africa League (BAL) as Malian representative. Two years later, Stade Malien became the second team from the country to qualify.

References

External links
Mali at AfroBasket.com

Basketball in Mali
Basketball leagues in Africa
Sports leagues in Mali